United FC is a South African football club based in Kimberley that plays in the National First Division.

Honours
2008–09 Vodacom League champions

External links
Premier Soccer League
NFD Club Info

Association football clubs established in 1999
National First Division clubs
Soccer clubs in the Northern Cape
SAFA Second Division clubs
1999 establishments in South Africa